Palio is the name given in Italy to an annual athletic contest, pitting the neighbourhoods of a town or the hamlets of a comune against each other.

Palio may also refer to:
 Fiat Palio, a supermini car by Fiat
 Palio (1932 film), Italian historical drama film by Alessandro Blasetti
 Palio (2015 film), British documentary film by Cosima Spender
 Palio (gastropod), a genus of sea slugs